Saint-Ferriol (Languedocien: Sant Ferriòl) is a commune in the Aude department in southern France.

Population

Sights
 Château de Saint-Ferriol, 16th-century castle

See also
Communes of the Aude department

References

Communes of Aude
Aude communes articles needing translation from French Wikipedia